The 2014–15 LSU Lady Tigers basketball team will represent Louisiana State University during the 2014–15 NCAA Division I women's basketball season college basketball season. The Lady Tigers are led by fourth year head coach Nikki Fargas. They play their home games at Pete Maravich Assembly Center and are members of the Southeastern Conference. They finished the season 17–14, 10–6 in SEC play to finish in a three way tie for fourth place. They advanced to the semifinals of the SEC women's tournament where they lost to LSU. They received an at-large bid to the NCAA women's tournament where they lost to South Florida in the first round.

Roster

Schedule and results

|-
!colspan=12 style="background:#33297B; color:#FDD023;"| Exhibition

|-
!colspan=12 style="background:#33297B; color:#FDD023;"| Non-conference regular season

|-
!colspan=12 style="background:#33297B; color:#FDD023;"| SEC regular season

|-
!colspan=12 style="background:#33297B;"| 2015 SEC Tournament

|-
!colspan=12 style="background:#33297B;"| NCAA Women's Tournament

Source:

Rankings

* The November 26 game vs. UTEP and November 27th vs. Kansas was canceled due to a facility conflict. Those games were not rescheduled.

References

See also
2014–15 LSU Tigers basketball team

LSU Lady Tigers basketball seasons
Lsu
Lsu
LSU
LSU